Charles Ortega (born September 23, 1955) is an American politician who served in the Oklahoma House of Representatives from the 52nd district from 2008 to 2020.

References

1955 births
Living people
Republican Party members of the Oklahoma House of Representatives
21st-century American politicians